Lukas Kunze (born 14 June 1998) is a German professional footballer who plays as a midfielder for  club VfL Osnabrück.

Early and personal life
Kunze was born in Bielefeld. He is the twin brother of fellow professional footballer Fabian Kunze, who plays in the Bundesliga for Arminia Bielefeld.

Career
After playing youth football for VfL Theesen, Schalke 04 and SV Rödinghausen, he made his senior debut for SV Rödinghausen on 19 August 2017 in a 3–3 Regionalliga West draw with Rot-Weiß Oberhausen. In June 2021, he signed for 3. Liga club VfL Osnabrück on a long-term contract.

References

External links

1998 births
Living people
German footballers
Sportspeople from Bielefeld
Footballers from North Rhine-Westphalia
Association football midfielders
3. Liga players
Regionalliga players
FC Schalke 04 players
SV Rödinghausen players
VfL Osnabrück players